Junonia chorimene, the golden pansy, is a butterfly in the family Nymphalidae. It is found in Senegal, the Gambia, Guinea-Bissau, Guinea, Mali, Sierra Leone, Ivory Coast, Burkina Faso, Ghana, Togo, Benin, Nigeria, the Democratic Republic of the Congo (Uele, Ituri, Kivu and Lualaba), Sudan, Ethiopia, Uganda, northern and western Kenya, northern Tanzania, south-western Arabia and Yemen. The habitat consists of riverine vegetation.

The larvae feed on Asystasia schimperi, Justicia leikepiensis, Barleria, Hypoestes, Paulowilhelmia and Ruellia species.

References

chorimene
Butterflies of Africa
Butterflies of Asia
Butterflies described in 1844